TVP Parlament is a Polish internet channel. It is run by the public broadcaster TVP and it offers coverage of Polish politics.

References

External links

Telewizja Polska
Television channels in Poland
Television channels and stations established in 2011
Legislature broadcasters